Steven Fisher (born 1965) is a British diplomat who was British Ambassador to the Dominican Republic and Haiti 2009–2015. Before that post he served as the Deputy Ambassador in Venezuela and Hungary.

Early life and education
Steven Fisher was born in Tiddington, Warwickshire, just outside Stratford.

Steven attended Wadham College, Oxford, where he studied Modern History and French. After he graduated from Oxford University, he worked for Andersen Consulting for five years.

Foreign and Commonwealth Office 
Steven joined the Foreign Office (FCO) in London in 1993 and worked in the European Union Department on a range of economic and trade related issues. His first overseas post came in 1995, when he was posted to Singapore. After working there for three years, he returned to London in August 1998. After four years of working in London, in 2002, Steven was posted to Venezuela as the Deputy Ambassador. In January 2006 he moved to Hungary, again as Deputy Ambassador.

From December 2009 to September 2015 he was Ambassador to the Dominican Republic and Haiti.

Following a home posting working on human rights policy (including Modern Slavery, Freedom of the Media and Freedom of Religion or Belief), he spent several months learning Romanian prior to a posting as HM Ambassador to the Republic of Moldova (Sept 2019 - ).

References 
FISHER, Steven Mark, Who's Who 2016, A & C Black, 2016 (online edition, Oxford University Press, 2015)

1965 births
Living people
People educated at Warwick School
Alumni of Wadham College, Oxford
Accenture people
Ambassadors of the United Kingdom to the Dominican Republic
Ambassadors of the United Kingdom to Haiti
Ambassadors of the United Kingdom to Moldova